King's College London (informally King's or KCL) is a public research university located in London, England. King's was established by royal charter in 1829 under the patronage of King George IV and the Duke of Wellington. In 1836, King's became one of the two founding colleges of the University of London. It is one of the oldest university-level institutions in England. In the late 20th century, King's grew through a series of mergers, including with Queen Elizabeth College and Chelsea College of Science and Technology (in 1985), the Institute of Psychiatry (in 1997), the United Medical and Dental Schools of Guy's and St Thomas' Hospitals and the Florence Nightingale School of Nursing and Midwifery (in 1998).

King's has five campuses: its historic Strand Campus in central London, three other Thames-side campuses (Guy's, St Thomas' and Waterloo) nearby and one in Denmark Hill in south London. It also has a presence in Shrivenham, Oxfordshire, for its professional military education, and another in Newquay, Cornwall, where its information service centre is based. Its academic activities are organised into nine faculties, which are subdivided into numerous departments, centres, and research divisions. In 2021/22, King's had a total income of £1.149 billion, of which £221.2 million was from research grants and contracts. It has the fourth largest endowment of any university in the United Kingdom, and the largest of any in London. King's is the fifth-largest university in the United Kingdom by total enrolment and receives over 70,000 undergraduate applications per year, making it the fourth-most popular university in the UK by volume of applications.

King's is a member of academic organisations including the Association of Commonwealth Universities, the European University Association, and the Russell Group. King's is home to six Medical Research Council centres and is a founding member of the King's Health Partners academic health sciences centre, Francis Crick Institute and MedCity. It is the largest European centre for graduate and post-graduate medical teaching and biomedical research, by number of students, and includes the world's first nursing school, the Florence Nightingale Faculty of Nursing and Midwifery. King's is generally regarded as part of the "golden triangle" of universities located in the cities of Oxford, Cambridge and London. King's has often had royal patronage by virtue of its foundation, with the late Queen Elizabeth II having been patron.

King's alumni and staff include 14 Nobel laureates; contributors to the discovery of DNA structure, Hepatitis C, the Hepatitis D genome, and the Higgs boson; pioneers of in-vitro fertilisation, stem cell/mammal cloning and the modern hospice movement; and key researchers advancing radar, radio, television and mobile phones. Alumni also include heads of states, governments and intergovernmental organisations; nineteen members of the current House of Commons and seventeen members of the current House of Lords; and the recipients of three Oscars, three Grammys, one Emmy and one Golden Globe.

History

Foundation 

King's College, so named to indicate the patronage of King George IV, was founded in 1829 (though the roots of King's medical school, St. Thomas, date back to the 16th century with recorded first teaching in 1561) in response to the theological controversy surrounding the founding of "London University" (which later became University College, London) in 1826. London University was founded, with the backing of Utilitarians, Jews and Nonconformists, as a secular institution, intended to educate "the youth of our middling rich people between the ages of 15 or 16 and 20 or later" giving its nickname, "the godless college in Gower Street". The need for such an institution was a result of the religious and social nature of the universities of Oxford and Cambridge, which then educated solely the sons of wealthy Anglicans. The secular nature of London University gained disapproval, indeed, "the storms of opposition which raged around it threatened to crush every spark of vital energy which remained".

The creation of King's College as a rival institution represented a Tory response to reassert the educational values of the established order. More widely, King's was one of the first of a series of institutions which came about in the early nineteenth century as a result of the Industrial Revolution and great social changes in England following the Napoleonic Wars. By virtue of its foundation King's has enjoyed the patronage of the monarch, the Archbishop of Canterbury as its visitor and during the nineteenth century counted among its official governors the Lord Chancellor, Speaker of the House of Commons and the Lord Mayor of London.

Duel in Battersea Fields, 21 March 1829 

The simultaneous support of Arthur Wellesley, 1st Duke of Wellington (who was also Prime Minister of the United Kingdom then), for an Anglican King's College London and the Roman Catholic Relief Act, which was to lead to the granting of almost full civil rights to Catholics, was challenged by George Finch-Hatton, 10th Earl of Winchilsea, in early 1829. Winchilsea and his supporters wished for King's to be subject to the Test Acts, like the universities of Oxford, where only members of the Church of England could matriculate, and Cambridge, where non-Anglicans could matriculate but not graduate, but this was not Wellington's intent.

Winchilsea and about 150 other contributors withdrew their support of King's College London in response to Wellington's support of Catholic emancipation. In a letter to Wellington, he accused the Duke to have in mind "insidious designs for the infringement of our liberty and the introduction of Popery into every department of the State". The letter provoked a furious exchange of correspondence and Wellington accused Winchilsea of imputing him with "disgraceful and criminal motives" in setting up King's College London. When Winchilsea refused to retract the remarks, Wellington – by his own admission, "no advocate of duelling" and a virgin duellist – demanded satisfaction in a contest of arms: "I now call upon your lordship to give me that satisfaction for your conduct which a gentleman has a right to require, and which a gentleman never refuses to give."

The result was a duel in Battersea Fields on 21 March 1829. Winchilsea did not fire, a plan he and his second almost certainly decided upon before the duel; Wellington took aim and fired wide to the right. Accounts differ as to whether Wellington missed on purpose. Wellington, noted for his poor aim, claimed he did, other reports more sympathetic to Winchilsea claimed he had aimed to kill. Honour was saved and Winchilsea wrote Wellington an apology. "Duel Day" is still celebrated on the first Thursday after 21 March every year, marked by various events throughout King's, including reenactments.

19th century 

King's opened in October 1831 with the cleric William Otter appointed as first principal and lecturer in divinity. The Archbishop of Canterbury presided over the opening ceremony, in which a sermon was given in the chapel by Charles James Blomfield, the Bishop of London, on the subject of combining religious instruction with intellectual culture. Despite the attempts to make King's Anglican-only, the initial prospectus permitted, "nonconformists of all sorts to enter the college freely". William Howley: the governors and the professors, except the linguists, had to be members of the Church of England but the students did not, though attendance at chapel was compulsory.

King's was divided into a senior department and a junior department, also known as King's College School, which was originally situated in the basement of the Strand Campus. The Junior department started with 85 pupils and only three teachers, but quickly grew to 500 by 1841, outgrowing its facilities and leading it to relocate to Wimbledon in 1897 where it remains today, though it is no longer associated with King's College London. Within the Senior department teaching was divided into three courses: a general course comprised divinity, classical languages, mathematics, English literature and history; a medical course; and miscellaneous subjects, such as law, political economy and modern languages, which were not related to any systematic course of study at the time and depended for their continuance on the supply of occasional students. In 1833 the general course was reorganised leading to the award of the Associate of King's College (AKC), the first qualification issued by King's. The course, which concerns questions of ethics and theology, is still awarded today to students and staff who take an optional three-year course alongside their studies.

The river frontage was completed in April 1835 at a cost of £7,100, its completion a condition of King's College London securing the site from the Crown. Unlike those in the school, student numbers in the Senior department remained almost stationary during King's first five years of existence. During this time the medical school was blighted by inefficiency and the divided loyalties of the staff leading to a steady decline in attendance. One of the most important appointments was that of Charles Wheatstone as professor of Experimental Philosophy.

At this time neither King's, "London University", nor the medical schools at the London hospitals could confer degrees. In 1835 the government announced that it would establish an examining board to grant degrees, with "London University" and King's both becoming affiliated colleges. This became the University of London in 1836, the former "London University" becoming University College, London (UCL). The first University of London degrees were awarded to King's College London students in 1839.

In 1840, King's opened its own hospital on Portugal Street near Lincoln's Inn Fields, an area composed of overcrowded rookeries characterised by poverty and disease. The governance of King's College Hospital was later transferred to the corporation of the hospital established by the King's College Hospital Act 1851. The hospital moved to new premises in Denmark Hill, Camberwell in 1913. The appointment in 1877 of Joseph Lister as professor of clinical surgery greatly benefited the medical school, and the introduction of Lister's antiseptic surgical methods gained the hospital an international reputation.

In 1845 King's established a Military Department to train officers for the Army and the British East India Company, and in 1846 a Theological Department to train Anglican priests. In 1855, King's pioneered evening classes in London; that King's granted students at the evening classes certificates of college attendance to enable them to sit University of London degree exams was cited as an example of the worthlessness of these certificates in the decision by the University of London to end the affiliated colleges system in 1858 and open their examinations to everyone.

In 1882 the King's College London Act amended the constitution. The act removed the proprietorial nature of King's, changing the name of the corporation from "The Governors and Proprietors of King's College, London" to "King's College London" and annulling the 1829 charter (although King's remained incorporated under that charter). The act also changed King's College London from a (technically) for-profit corporation to a non-profit one (no dividends had ever been paid in over 50 years of operation) and extended the objects of King's to include the education of women. The Ladies' Department of King's College London was opened in Kensington Square in 1885, which later in 1902 became King's College Women's Department.

20th century 

The King's College London Act 1903, abolished all remaining religious tests for staff, except within the Theological department. In 1910, King's was (with the exception of the Theological department) merged into the University of London under the King's College London (Transfer) Act 1908, losing its legal independence.

During the First World War, the medical school was opened to women for the first time. From 1916 to 1921, the college's Department of Italian was headed by a woman, Linetta de Castelvecchio. The end of the war saw an influx of students, which strained existing facilities to the point where some classes were held in the Principal's house.

In World War II, the buildings of King's College London were used by the Auxiliary Fire Service with a number of King's staff, mainly those then known as college servants, serving as firewatchers. Parts of the Strand building, the quadrangle, and the roof of apse and stained glass windows of the chapel suffered bomb damage in the Blitz. During the post-war reconstruction, the vaults beneath the quadrangle were replaced by a two-storey laboratory, which opened in 1952, for the departments of Physics and Civil and Electrical Engineering.

One of the most famous pieces of scientific research performed at King's were the crucial contributions to the discovery of the double helix structure of DNA in 1953 by Maurice Wilkins and Rosalind Franklin, together with Raymond Gosling, Alex Stokes, Herbert Wilson, and other colleagues at the Randall Division of Cell and Molecular Biophysics at King's.

Major reconstruction of King's began in 1966 following the publication of the Robbins Report on Higher Education. A new block facing the Strand designed by E. D. Jefferiss Mathews was opened in 1972. In 1980 King's regained its legal independence under a new Royal Charter. In 1993 King's, along with other large University of London colleges, gained direct access to government funding (which had previously been through the university) and the right to confer University of London degrees itself. This contributed to King's and the other large colleges being regarded as de facto universities in their own right.

King's College London underwent several mergers with other institutions in the late 20th century. These including the reincorporation in 1983 of the King's College School of Medicine and Dentistry, which had become independent of King's College Hospital at the foundation of the National Health Service in 1948, mergers with
Queen Elizabeth College and Chelsea College in 1985, and the Institute of Psychiatry in 1997. In 1998 the United Medical and Dental Schools of Guy's and St Thomas' Hospitals merged with King's to form the GKT School of Medical Education. Also in 1998 Florence Nightingale's original training school for nurses merged with the King's Department of Nursing Studies as the Florence Nightingale School of Nursing and Midwifery. The same year King's acquired the former Public Record Office building on Chancery Lane and converted it at a cost of £35 million into the Maughan Library, which opened in 2002.

21st century 

In July 2006, King's College London was granted degree-awarding powers in its own right, as opposed to through the University of London, by the Privy Council. This power remained unexercised until 2007, when King's announced that all students starting courses from September 2007 onwards would be awarded degrees conferred by King's itself, rather than by the University of London. The new certificates however still make reference to the fact that King's is a constituent college of the University of London. All current students with at least one year of study remaining were in August 2007 offered the option of choosing to be awarded a University of London degree or a King's degree. The first King's degrees were awarded in summer 2008.

In April 2011 King's became a founding partner in the UK Centre for Medical Research and Innovation, subsequently renamed the Francis Crick Institute, committing £40 million to the project. The Chemistry department was reopened in 2011 following its closure in 2003. In February 2012, Her Majesty The Queen officially opened Somerset House East Wing.

In September 2014 King's College London opened King's College London Mathematics School, a free school sixth form located in Lambeth that specialises in mathematics. In October 2014, Ed Byrne replaced Rick Trainor as Principal of King's College London, the latter having served for 10 years. In December 2014, King's announced its plans to rebrand its name to 'King's London'. It was emphasised that there were no plans to change the legal name of King's, and that the name 'King's London' was designed to promote King's and to highlight the fact that King's is a university in its own right. King's announced that the rebranding plans had been dropped in January 2015.

On 10 March 2015, King's acquired a 50-year lease for the Aldwych Quarter site incorporating the historic grand Bush House building. It began occupation of the Bush House Building in September 2016 and will occupy the adjacent King House and Strand House from 2017 and Melbourne House from 2025. In October 2016, King's announced it had also taken a separate 50-year lease on the North-West Block of the Aldwych Quarter which it will incorporate from 2018.

Campus

Strand Campus 

The Strand Campus is the founding campus of King's and is located on the Strand in the City of Westminster, sharing its frontage along the River Thames.  The original campus comprises the Grade I listed King's Building of 1831 designed by Sir Robert Smirke, and the King's College London Chapel redesigned in 1864 by Sir Gilbert Scott, with the subsequent purchase of much of adjacent Surrey Street (including the Norfolk and Chesham Buildings) since the Second World War and the 1972 Strand Building. The Macadam Building of 1975 houses the Strand Campus Students' Union and is named after King's alumnus Sir Ivison Macadam, first President of the National Union of Students.

The Strand Campus houses the arts and science faculties of King's, including the faculties of Arts & Humanities, Law, Business, Social Science & Public Policy and Natural & Mathematical Sciences (formerly Physical Sciences & Engineering). It also houses the Office of the President and Principal.

Since 2010, the campus has expanded rapidly to incorporate the East Wing of Somerset House and the Virginia Woolf Building next to LSE on Kingsway. On 10 March 2015, King's acquired a 50-year lease for the Aldwych Quarter site incorporating the historic grand Bush House building. It began occupation of the Bush House Building in September 2016, occupying the adjacent King House and Strand House from 2017 and will occupy Melbourne House from 2025.  In October 2016, King's announced it had also taken a separate 50-year lease on the North-West Block from 2018.

The nearest Underground stations are Temple, Charing Cross and Covent Garden.

Guy's Campus 

Guy's Campus is situated close to London Bridge and the Shard on the South Bank of the Thames and is home to the Faculty of Life Sciences & Medicine and the Dental Institute.

The campus is named for Thomas Guy, the founder and benefactor of Guy's Hospital established in 1726 in the London Borough of Southwark. Buildings include: the Henriette Raphael building, constructed in 1902, the Gordon Museum of Pathology, the Hodgkin building, Shepherd's House and Guy's Chapel. The Students' Union has extensive facilities on the Guy's Campus including activity rooms, meeting rooms alongside a student cafe; The Shed and student bar; Guy's Bar. Guy's Campus is located opposite the Old Operating Theatre Museum, which was part of old St Thomas Hospital in Southwark.

The nearest Underground stations are London Bridge and Borough.

Waterloo Campus 

The Waterloo Campus is located across Waterloo Bridge from the Strand Campus, near the Southbank Centre in the London Borough of Lambeth and consists of the James Clerk Maxwell Building, the Franklin–Wilkins Building and the Waterloo Bridge Wing Building.

Cornwall House, now the Franklin-Wilkins Building, constructed between 1912 and 1915 was originally the His Majesty's Stationery Office (responsible for Crown copyright and National Archives), but was requisitioned for use as a military hospital in 1915 during World War I. It became the King George Military Hospital, and accommodated about 1,800 patients on 63 wards.

Now the largest university building in London, the building was acquired by King's in the 1980s and underwent extensive refurbishment in 2000. The building is named after Rosalind Franklin and Maurice Wilkins for their major contributions to the discovery of the structure of DNA. Today it is home to:
 the School of Biomedical Sciences, Diabetes & Nutritional Sciences Division (part of the Faculty of Life Sciences & Medicine)
 the School of Education, Communication and Society (part of the Faculty of Social Science & Public Policy)
 LonDEC – the London Dental Education Centre (part of the Faculty of Dental, Oral & Craniofacial Sciences)
The adjacent James Clerk Maxwell Building houses the Florence Nightingale Faculty of Nursing, Midwifery & Palliative Care and many of the central professional services functions of the college. The Building was named after Scottish mathematical physicist James Clerk Maxwell, who was the Professor of Natural Philosophy at King's from 1860 to 1865.

The nearest Underground station is Waterloo.

St Thomas's Campus 

The St Thomas' Campus in the London Borough of Lambeth, facing the Houses of Parliament across the Thames, houses parts of the School of Medicine and the Dental Institute. The Florence Nightingale Museum is also located here. The museum is dedicated to Florence Nightingale, the founder of the Nightingale Training School of St Thomas' Hospital (now King's Florence Nightingale Faculty of Nursing, Midwifery & Palliative Care). St Thomas' Hospital became part of King's College London School of Medicine in 1998. The St Thomas' Hospital and Campus were named after St Thomas Becket. The Department of Twin Research (TwinsUk), King's College London is located in St. Thomas' Hospital.

The nearest Underground station is Westminster.

Denmark Hill Campus 

Denmark Hill Campus is situated in south London near the borders of the London Borough of Lambeth and the London Borough of Southwark in Camberwell and is the only campus not situated on the River Thames. The campus consists of King's College Hospital, the Maudsley Hospital and the Institute of Psychiatry, Psychology and Neuroscience (IoPPN). In addition to the Institute of Psychiatry, Psychology and Neuroscience, parts of the Dental Institute and School of Medicine, and a large hall of residence, King's College Hall, are situated here. Other buildings include the campus library known as the Weston Education Centre (WEC), the James Black Centre, the Rayne Institute (haemato-oncology) and the Cicely Saunders Institute (palliative care).

The Maurice Wohl Clinical Neuroscience Institute was opened by the Princess Royal in 2015 at the Denmark Hill Campus. It is named after British philanthropist Maurice Wohl, who had a long association with King's and supported many medical projects.

The nearest Overground station is Denmark Hill.

Shrivenham 
Whilst not a formal campus, King's retains an academic presence and estate at the Defence Academy of the United Kingdom in Shrivenham, Oxfordshire. Through its Defence Studies Department, King's has delivered professional military training to much of the UK armed services through the Joint Services Command and Staff College since 2000 under contract to the Ministry of Defence.

Redevelopment programme 
As of 2016, King's is undergoing a £1 billion redevelopment programme of its estates. Since 1999 over half of the activities of King's have been relocated in new and refurbished buildings. Major completed projects include a £35 million renovation of the Maughan Library in 2002, a £40 million renovation of buildings at the Strand Campus, a £25 million renovation of Somerset House East Wing, a £30 million renovation of the Denmark Hill Campus in 2007, the renovation of the Franklin-Wilkins Library at the Waterloo Campus and the completion of the £9 million Cicely Saunders Institute of Palliative Care in 2010. The College Chapel at the Strand was also restored in 2001, and its organ in 2018.

The Strand Campus redevelopment won the Green Gown Award in 2007 for sustainable construction. The award recognised the "reduced energy and carbon emissions from a sustainable refurbishment of the historic South Range of the King's Building". King's was also the recipient of the 2003 City Heritage Award for the conversion of the Grade II* listed Maughan Library.

Current projects include a £45 million development for the Maurice Wohl Clinical Neuroscience Institute, £18 million on modernising King's learning and teaching environments, a sports pavilion at Honor Oak Park. In April 2012 a £20 million redevelopment of the Strand Campus Quad was announced and will provide an additional 3,700 square metres of teaching space and student facilities.

King's acquired a lease for the Aldwych Quarter with initial term of 50 years. King's will occupy Bush House and Strand House from September 2016, and King House and Melbourne House from 2025. The then-Chairman of King's College London, Charles Wellesley, 9th Duke of Wellington said that the King's Strand Campus has had inadequate and cramped teaching space for too long, and the acquisition will transform the original campus of King's which dates back to 1829.

Organisation and administration

Governance 

The head of King's College London is formally the President and Principal, currently Shitij Kapur, who began his term in June 2021, following the retirement of Sir Ed Byrne in January 2021.

The office of "Principal and President of the College" is established by King's royal charter as "the chief academic and executive officer of the College" and the college statutes require the principal to have the general responsibility to the college council for "ensuring that the objects of the College are fulfilled and for maintaining and promoting the efficiency, discipline and good order of the College". The charter and statutes also authorise the appointment of one or more vice principals, who "assist the Principal and President in such matters as the Principal and President may from time to time delegate to them". The current principal, Shitji Kapoor, uses the title "President and Principal" and no senior officer uses the title of vice principal. The current senior officers of the college include three senior vice presidents, covering the areas of: academic; health and life science; and operations. There are also five vice presidents covering the areas of: finance (also the college's chief financial officer); education and student success; international, engagement and service; research and innovation; and people and talent.

The college council is the supreme governing body of King's College London established under the charter and statutes, comprising 21 members. Its membership includes the President of King's College London Students' Union (KCLSU) as the student member; the Principal and President; up to seven other staff members; and up to 12 lay members who must not be employees of King's. It is supported by a number of standing committees. Sir Christopher Geidt, formerly Private Secretary to HM Queen Elizabeth II (the patron of King's College London at the time he took up the role of chairman) succeeded Charles Wellesley, 9th Duke of Wellington as 
Chairman of Council from the beginning of the 2016 academic year; he subsequently became Lord Geidt on 3 November 2017.

The current Dean of King's College London is the Reverend Dr Ellen Clark-King. The office of dean is established by the college's ordinances and, under the ordinances passed by the college council in July 2022, has to be an ordained minister of the Church of England That the dean is an ordained person is unusual among British universities, but reflects King's foundation in the tradition of the Church of England in 1829. The dean is "responsible for overseeing the spiritual development and welfare of all students and staff". The Office of the Dean co-ordinates the Associateship of King's College programme, the College Chaplaincy and the Choir of King's College London, which includes a number of choral scholarships. One of the dean's roles is to encourage and foster vocations to the Church of England priesthood.

The Archbishop of Canterbury is King's College London's visitor by right of office owing to the Anglican foundation of King's. The current visitor is The Most Reverend Justin Welby.

Faculties and departments 
In the 19th century, King's College London had five departments: Theological, General Literature and Science, Applied Sciences, Medical and Military. The Theological Department provided studies in ecclesiastical history, pastoral theology and Exegesis of testaments. Languages and literature, history, law and jurisprudence, political economy, commerce, fencing, mathematics, zoology and natural history were taught within the Department of General Literature and Science, and natural philosophy, geology, mineralogy and arts-related subjects were taught within the Department of Applied Sciences.

, King's comprises nine academic faculties, which are subdivided into schools (for Social Science & Public Policy, Life Sciences & Medicine), departments, centres and research divisions. The latest addition was King's Business School, hosted in Bush House, which opened in August 2017.

Faculty of Arts and Humanities 

The Faculty of Arts and Humanities was formed in 1989 following the amalgamation of the faculties of Arts, Music and Theology. The faculty encompasses traditional disciplinary subjects, as well as less-common subjects such as Hellenic, Portuguese and Medieval Studies, and emerging disciplines such as Digital Humanities and Queer Studies.

The Royal Academy of Dramatic Art (RADA) is administered through King's, and its students graduate alongside members of the departments which form the Faculty of Arts and Humanities. As RADA does not have degree awarding powers, its courses are validated by King's.

Faculty of Dentistry, Oral & Craniofacial Sciences 
The Faculty of Dentistry, Oral & Craniofacial Sciences (formerly Dental Institute) is the dental school of King's and focuses on understanding disease, enhancing health and restoring function. The institute is the successor of Guy's Hospital Dental School, King's College Hospital Dental School, Royal Dental Hospital of London School of Dental Surgery, and the United Medical and Dental Schools of Guy's and St Thomas' Hospitals. It was a part of King's School of Medicine and Dentistry until 2005, when the dental school became the Dental Institute and then renamed in 2019.

In 1799 Joseph Fox started to give a series of lectures on dental surgery at Guy's Hospital, and was appointed dental surgeon in the same year. Thomas Bell succeeded Fox as dental surgeon either in 1817 or 1825. Frederick Newland-Pedley, who was appointed assistant dental surgeon at Guy's Hospital in 1885, advocated the establishment of a dental school within the hospital, and he flooded the two dental schools in London, the Metropolitan School of Dental Science and the London School of Dental Surgery, with patients to prove that a further hospital was needed. In December 1888, Guy's Hospital Dental School was established. Guy's Hospital Dental School was recognised as a school of the University of London in 1901. In the 1970s, since there was a decline in the demand for dental services, the Department of Health of the UK suggested that there should be a decrease in the number of dental undergraduate students as well as the duration of all courses. In response to the recommendations, Royal Dental Hospital of London School of Dental Surgery amalgamated with the Guy's Hospital Dental School of the United Medical and Dental Schools of Guy's and St Thomas' Hospitals on 1 August 1983.

The establishment of King's College Hospital Dental School was proposed by Viscount Hambleden at a Hospital Management Committee meeting on 12 April 1923. The dental school was opened on 12 November 1923 in King's College Hospital. Under the 1948 National Health Act, King's Medical and Dental School split from King's and became an independent school, but the school remerged with King's in 1983. The school further merged with the United Medical and Dental Schools of Guy's and St Thomas’ Hospitals in 1998.

Faculty of Life Sciences and Medicine 

The Faculty of Life Sciences and Medicine was created as a result of the merger of the School of Medicine with the School of Biomedical Sciences in 2014.

There are two schools of education in the Faculty of Life Sciences and Medicine: the GKT School of Medical Education is responsible for the medical education and training of students on the MBBS programme, and the School of Bioscience Education is responsible for the biomedical and health professions education and training. The faculty is further divided into 7 schools, including Basic & Medical Biosciences, Biomedical Engineering & Imaging Sciences, Cancer & Pharmaceutical Science, Cardiovascular Medicine & Sciences, Immunology & Microbial Sciences, Life Course Sciences and Population Health Sciences.

Institute of Psychiatry, Psychology and Neuroscience 

The Institute of Psychiatry, Psychology and Neuroscience (IoPPN) is a faculty and a research institution dedicated to discovering what causes mental illness and diseases of the brain, and to help identify new treatments of the diseases. The institute is the largest centre for research and postgraduate education in psychiatry, psychology and neuroscience in Europe. Originally established in 1924 as the Maudsley Hospital Medical School, the institute changed its name to the Institute of Psychiatry in 1948, merged with King's College London in 1997, and was renamed IoPPN in 2014.

Dickson Poon School of Law 

The Dickson Poon School of Law is the law school of King's. Law has been taught at King's since 1831.  The Faculty of Laws was founded in 1909 and became the School of Law in 1991.

The school includes various research centres and groups which serve as focal points for research activity, including the Centre of European Law (established in 1974), Centre of Medical Law and Ethics (established in 1978), Centre of British Constitutional Law and History (established in 1988), Centre of Construction Law, Centre for Technology, Ethics and Law in Society, Centre for Politics, Philosophy and Law, Transnational Law Institute and Trust Law Committee.

Faculty of Natural, Mathematical & Engineering Sciences 
The Faculty of Natural and Mathematical Sciences was established in 2010, following the reorganisation of the School of Physical Sciences and Engineering. It was renamed in February 2021 to incorporate the return of engineering as a major discipline. The faculty provides education and research in chemistry, informatics, physics, mathematics, engineering and telecommunications. Physics and Mathematics has been studied at the university since 1829 and 1830 respectively, and there are six Nobel laureates who were either students or academic staff of the faculty. Most notably, its teaching of experimental Physics is the oldest in England having fostered the professorships of James Clerk Maxwell, Harold A. Wilson, Charles Glover Barkla, Sir Owen Richardson, Sir Edward Appleton and Sir Charles Ellis, three of whom became Nobel laureates.

Chemistry has been taught at King's since its foundation in 1829, and Copley medallist John Frederic Daniell was appointed the first professor. The Department of Chemistry was forced to close in 2003 due to a decline in student numbers and reduced funding. In 2012, a new Department of Chemistry was established and a new undergraduate degree, Chemistry with Biomedicine, was launched. The new department covers traditional areas of chemistry (organic, inorganic, physical and computational chemistry) and other academic discipline including cell biology and physics.

The Department of Engineering was established in 1838, making it arguably the oldest school of engineering in the United Kingdom. Equally, the King's College Engineering Society is the oldest society of its kind, having been founded 1847, six days before the Institution of Mechanical Engineers. The Department of Engineering was the largest engineering school in the UK in 1893. The Division of Engineering was closed in 2013, and reinstalled in 2019.

Florence Nightingale Faculty of Nursing and Midwifery 

The Florence Nightingale Faculty of Nursing and Midwifery is a school for nurses and midwives. It also carries out nursing research and provides continuing professional development and postgraduate programmes. Formerly known as the Nightingale Training School and Home for Nurses, the faculty was established by Florence Nightingale in 1860, and is the first nursing school in the world to be continuously connected to a fully serving hospital and medical school.

The Nightingale Training School was amalgamated in 1996 with the Olive Haydon School of Midwifery and the Thomas Guy and Lewisham School of Nursing, and all staff and students were integrated at King's by 1996.

Faculty of Social Science and Public Policy 
The Faculty of Social Science and Public Policy was established in 2001, and is one of the largest university centres focusing on policy-oriented research in the UK. Following a restructuring in 2016, it is split into four schools:
 School of Politics & Economics (European & International Studies, Middle Eastern Studies, Political Economy, Russia Institute)
 School of Education, Communication and Society
 School of Global Affairs (Geography, Global Health & Medicine, International Development, Brazil Institute, India Institute, Lau China Institute)
 School of Security Studies (Department of Defence Studies, Department of War Studies)

The Department of War Studies is unique in the UK and is supported by research facilities such as the King's Centre for Strategic Communications, Liddell Hart Centre for Military Archives and the King's Centre for Military Health Research (KCMHR).

Set up in 2002, the King's Centre for Risk Management (KCRM) holds international research relating to risk management, governance and communication, and supports various projects, conferences and academic fellowships, facilitating in translating risk research into relevant and practical policy solutions.

The faculty also houses the African Leadership Centre, Institute for Contemporary British History, and London Asia Pacific Centre for Social Science.

King's Business School 

King's Business School was established in August 2017 at Bush House. The School of Management and Business within the Faculty of Social Science and Public Policy was reformed to create King's Business School. The school was ranked second by The Complete University Guide in the UK for Business and Management studies in its 2021 league table.

Following an expansion of the business school, four research centers were formed as follows: 
 Consumer and Organisational Digital Analytics (CODA)
 Data Analytics for Finance and Macro (DAFM)
 FinWork Futures
 Qatar Centre for Global Banking & Finance

King's Business School offers both undergraduate and postgraduate degrees. It offers programmes in economics, management, finance, entrepreneurship, human resource management and marketing. Undergraduate management courses base their curriculum on "modern business theory and organisational management theory and practice". Other fields that overlap with the core content being taught include finance, accounting, economics, social science, psychology, and law. Undergraduate courses such as Business Management feature a high percentage of international students (81%) and a large female cohort, comprising 58% of the student body.

Finances 
In the financial year ended 31 July 2019, King's had a total income of £901.96 million (2017/18 – £841.03 million) and total expenditure of £1089.88 million (2017/18 – £842.43 million). Key sources of income included £393.79 million from tuition fees and education contracts (2017/18 – £342.25 million), £194.68 million from research grants and contracts (2017/18 – £194.42 million), £128.30 million from Funding Council grants (2017/18 – £123.89 million) and £5.12 million from endowment and investment income (2017/18 – £6.19 million). During the 2018/19 financial year King's had a capital expenditure of £78.9 million (2017/18 – £133.7 million).

At 31 July 2019 King's had total endowments of £258.07 million (31 July 2018 – £233.46 million) and total net assets of £791.58 million (31 July 2018 – £945.86 million). King's has a credit rating of AA from Standard & Poor's. Its total endowment is the 4th highest amongst UK universities; behind only Oxford, Cambridge and Edinburgh.

In 2013/14, King's had the seventh-highest total income of any British university. By 2018/19, it is now sixth after overtaking University of Edinburgh's total income.

In October 2010 King's launched a major fundraising campaign—"World questions|King's answers"—fronted by former British Prime Minister John Major, with a goal to raise £500 million by 2015. This was surpassed even before 2015 and King's subsequently increased the target to £600 million. It again met and beat this new target by raising £610 million.

King's has received numerous grants from the Bill & Melinda Gates Foundation to support various research projects in global health and global development.

Coat of arms 

The coat of arms displayed on the King's College London charter is that of George IV. No correspondence is believed to have survived regarding the choice of this coat of arms, either in King's archives or at the College of Arms, and a variety of unofficial adaptations have been used throughout the history of King's. The current coat of arms was developed following the mergers with Queen Elizabeth College and Chelsea College in 1985 and incorporates aspects of their heraldry. The official coat of arms, in heraldic terminology, is:

Arms:

Or on a Pale Azure between two Lions rampant respectant Gules an Anchor Gold ensigned by a Royal Crown proper on a Chief Argent an Ancient Lamp proper inflamed Gold between two Blazing Hearths also proper.

The crest and supporters:
On a Helm with a Wreath Or and Azure Upon a Book proper rising from a Coronet Or the rim set with jewels two Azure (one manifest) four Vert (two manifest) and two Gules a demi Lion Gules holding a Rod of Dexter a female figure habited Azure the cloak lined coif and sleeves Argent holding in the exterior hand a Lond Cross botony Gold and sinister a male figure the Long Coat Azure trimmed with Sable proper shirt Argent holding in the interior hand a Book proper.

Coat of arms of the medical schools 

Although the St Thomas's Hospital Medical School and Guy's Medical School became legal bodies separate from St Thomas' Hospital and Guy's Hospital in 1948, the tradition of using the hospitals' shields and coat of arms continues today.

In 1949, St Thomas's Hospital Medical School was granted its own coat of arms. However, the St Thomas' Hospital coat of arms has still been used. Guy's Medical School proposed to apply for its own coat of arms after separating from Guy's Hospital, yet the school decided to continue to use Guy's Hospital's arms in 1954. The two medical schools merged in 1982 and became the United Medical and Dental Schools of Guy's and St Thomas' Hospitals (UMDS). Simon Argles, secretary of UMDS, said that because of the name of the medical school it was more appropriate to use the hospital's coat of arms.

UMDS merged with King's College Hospital to become Guy's, King's and St Thomas' School of Medicine in 1998. The shields of Guy's and St Thomas’ hospitals are used in conjunction with King's shield in the medical schools' publications and graduation materials.

Affiliations and partnerships 
King's College London is a member institution and was one of the two founding colleges of the federal University of London. In 1998, King's joined the Russell Group, an association of 24 public research universities established in 1994. King's is also a member of the Institutional Network of the Universities from the Capitals of Europe (UNICA), a network of higher education institutions based in European capital cities, and of the Association of Commonwealth Universities (ACU), the European University Association (EUA) and Universities UK.

King's is typically regarded as part of the "golden triangle", a grouping of research universities located in the English cities of Cambridge, Oxford and London that generally also includes the universities of Cambridge and Oxford, Imperial College London, the London School of Economics, and University College London.

King's College London is also a part of King's Health Partners, an academic health science centre comprises Guy's and St Thomas' NHS Foundation Trust, King's College Hospital NHS Foundation Trust, South London and Maudsley NHS Foundation Trust and King's College London itself. King's is a participant and one of the founding members of the Francis Crick Institute. Furthermore, launched in 2014, MedCity is the collaboration between King's and the other two main science universities in London, Imperial College and University College London.

In 2016, King's College London, together with Arizona State University and University of New South Wales, formed the PLuS Alliance, an international university alliance to address global challenges. King's is also the founding partner of FutureLearn, a massive open online course learning platform founded in December 2012.

King's offers joint degrees with many universities and other institutions, including Columbia University, University of Paris I, University of Hong Kong, National University of Singapore, Royal Academy of Music, British Library, Tate Modern, Shakespeare's Globe, National Gallery, National Portrait Gallery and British Museum.

In the field of Mathematics, King's College London has a joint venture with Imperial College London and University College London running the London School of Geometry and Number Theory (LSGNT), which is an EPSRC-funded Centre for Doctoral Training (CDT). The LSGNT offers a wide range of 4-year PhD research projects in different aspects of number theory, geometry and topology.

Another partnership King's College London has with both Imperial College London and University College London is the field of Nanotechnology, where all 3 universities jointly run the London Centre for Nanotechnology (LCN). LCN is a multidisciplinary research centre in physical and biomedical nanotechnology focused on exploitation and commercialisation of research generated in the relevant fields.

King's College London joined the SES engineering and physical sciences research alliance in 2016, which includes the universities of Cambridge, Oxford and Southampton, Imperial College London, Queen Mary University of London, and University College London as members. King's College London is also a member of the Thomas Young Centre, an alliance of London research groups working on the theory and simulation of materials, along with Imperial College London, University College London and Queen Mary University of London.

The university is also a member of the University of London Screen Studies Group with other institutions from the University of London.

Academics

Admissions 

King's had the 13th highest average entry qualification for undergraduates of any UK university in 2018, with new students averaging 171 UCAS points. In 2015, the university gave offers of admission to 66.7% of its applicants, the 7th lowest amongst the Russell Group.

24.4% of King's undergraduates are privately educated, the fourteenth highest proportion amongst mainstream British universities. In the 2016–17 academic year, the university had a domicile breakdown of 67:12:20 of UK:EU:non-EU students respectively with a female to male ratio of 62:37.

A freedom-of-information request in 2015 revealed that the university received 31,857 undergraduate applications and made 13,302 offers in 2014–15. This resulted in an offer rate of 41.8%, a yield rate on offers of 45.3% and an overall acceptance rate of 18.9%. In 2018, King's College London received 39,102 undergraduate applications, with only 4,728 places accepted it means an overall acceptance rate of 12.1%. The School of Medicine received 1,764 applications, only 39 offers were made resulting in an offer rate of just 2.2%. Nursery & Midwifery, Physiotherapy and Clinical Dentistry had the lowest offer rates of 14%, 16% and 17% respectively.

Teaching 
King's academic year runs from the last Monday in September to the first Friday in June. Different faculties and departments adopt different academic term structures. For example, the academic year of the Mathematics School and Department of War Studies is divided into three terms (Autumn, Spring and Summer terms); while the Faculty of Arts & Humanities academic year runs in two semesters.

Graduation 

Graduation ceremonies are held in January (winter) and June or July (summer), with ceremonies for students from most faculties held in next door to the Waterloo Campus at the Southbank Centre on the banks of the Thames. Ceremonies were held at Europe's largest arts complex, the Barbican Centre, until 2018.

Owing to St Thomas's Medical School roots that could be traced to St Mary Overie Priory, students from the GKT School of Medical Education and Faculty of Dental, Oral & Craniofacial Sciences graduate from Southwark Cathedral adjacent to Guy's Campus.

After being vested the power to award its own degrees separately from the University of London in 2006, graduates began wearing King's College London academic dress in 2008. King's graduates have since worn gowns designed by Vivienne Westwood.

Research 
In 2013/14 King's had a total research income of £171.55 million, of which £47.64 million was from UK charitable bodies; £38.26 million from Research Councils; £32.97 million from UK central government, local authorities, health and hospital authorities; £21.38 million from EU government and other bodies; £17.09 million from overseas (excluding EU); £13.11 million from UK industry, commerce and public corporations; and £1.11 million from other sources.

In the 2021 Research Excellence Framework (REF), which assesses the quality of research in UK higher education institutions, King's is ranked 9th by GPA and 6th for research power (the grade point average score of a university, multiplied by the full-time equivalent number of researchers submitted). King's submitted a total of 1,369 staff across 27 units of assessment to the 2014 Research Excellence Framework (REF) assessment (compared with 1,172 submitted to the 2008 Research Assessment Exercise (RAE 2008)). In the REF results 40% of King's submitted research was classified as 4*, 45% as 3*, 13% as 2* and 2% as 1*, giving an overall GPA of 3.23. In rankings produced by Times Higher Education based upon the REF results King's was ranked 6th overall for research power and 7th for GPA (compared to 11th and joint 22nd respectively in the equivalent rankings for the RAE 2008). The Times Higher Education described King's as "arguably the biggest winner" in REF2014 after it rose 15 places on GPA, while submitting about 200 more people.

Medicine 

King's claims to be the largest centre for healthcare education in Europe. King's College London School of Medicine has over 2,000 undergraduate students, over 1,400 teachers, four main teaching hospitals – Guy's Hospital, King's College Hospital, St Thomas' Hospital and University Hospital Lewisham – and 17 associated district general hospitals. It is also ranked the 8th best University in the world to study Medicine at. King's College London Dental Institute is the largest dental school in Europe. The Florence Nightingale School of Nursing & Midwifery is the oldest professional school of nursing in the world.

King's is a major centre for biomedical research. It is a founding member of King's Health Partners, one of the largest academic health sciences centres in Europe with a turnover of over £2 billion and approximately 25,000 employees. It also is home to six Medical Research Council centres, and is part of two of the twelve biomedical research centres established by the National Institute for Health and Care Research (NIHR) in England – the NIHR Biomedical Research Centre at Guy's and St Thomas' NHS Foundation Trust and King's College London, and the NIHR Biomedical Research Centre at the South London and Maudsley NHS Foundation Trust and King's College London.

The Drug Control Centre at King's was established in 1978 and is the only WADA accredited anti-doping laboratory in the UK and holds the official UK contract for running doping tests on UK athletes. In 1997, it became the first International Olympic Committee accredited laboratory to meet the ISO/IEC 17025 quality standard. The centre was the anti-doping facility for the London 2012 Olympic and Paralympic Games.

Libraries 
King's library facilities are spread across its campuses. The collections encompass over one million printed books, as well as thousands of journals and electronic resources.

Maughan Library 

The Maughan Library is King's largest library and is housed in the Grade II* listed 19th century gothic former Public Record Office building situated on Chancery Lane at the Strand Campus. The building was designed by Sir James Pennethorne and is home to the books and journals of the Schools of Arts & Humanities, Law, Natural & Mathematical Sciences, and Social Science & Public Policy. It also houses the Special Collections and rare books. Inside the Library is the octagonal Round Reading Room, inspired by the reading room of the British Museum, and the former Rolls Chapel (renamed the Weston Room following a donation from the Garfield Weston Foundation) with its stained glass windows, mosaic floor and monuments, including a Renaissance terracotta figure by Pietro Torrigiano of Dr Yonge, Master of the Rolls, who died in 1516.

Other libraries 
 Foyle Special Collections Library: Situated at Chancery Lane, the library houses a collection of 180,000 printed works as well as thousands of maps, slides, sound recordings and some manuscript material. The collections are built up by purchase, gift and bequest over centuries, which cover all subject areas and contain many special items, including incunabula. The collections are particularly strong in European military and diplomatic history, Jewish and Christian theology, the history of the British Empire, Greece and the Eastern Mediterranean, Germany, voyages and travels, medicine and science.
 Tony Arnold Library: Situated at Chancery Lane, it houses a collection of over 3000 law books and 140 law journals. It was named after Tony Arnold, the longest serving Secretary of the Institute of Taxation. The library was opened on 18 December 1997, and in September 2001, the library became part of the law collection of King's College London.
 Archives Reading Room: Situated at Chancery Lane, it holds a collection of institutional and research papers from King's and organisations merged with or founded by King's (such as King's College Hospital, Guy's and St Thomas’ medical and dental schools, the Institute of Psychiatry). The reading room also houses research papers of former staff and students, including Sir Charles Wheatstone, Maurice Wilkins and Eric Mottram.
 Franklin-Wilkins Library: Situated at the Waterloo Campus, the library is home to extensive management and education holdings, as well as wide-ranging biomedical, health and life sciences coverage includes nursing, midwifery, public health, pharmacy, biological and environmental sciences, biochemistry and forensic science.
 Wills Library and Keats Room: Situated in the Hodgkin Building at Guy's Campus, it was originally the main library for the Guy's Hospital Medical School. The Wills Library was a gift in 1903 by the former governor of Guy's Hospital, the late Sir Frederick Wills and it was opened as the Medical School Library. Many books, archives and documents that were kept in the Wills Library, such as Guy's committee minute books, have been moved to the King's College London Archives in 2004, although the library still contains a collection of books that can be retrieved by request. The Wills Library also incorporates the Keats Room named after King's alumni John Keats, who was a medical student at Guy's Hospital.
 New Hunt's House Library: Situated at Guy's Campus, the library covers all aspects of biomedical science, including anatomy, biochemistry, cell biology, genetics, neuroscience, pharmacology and physiology. There are also extensive resources for medicine, dentistry, physiotherapy and health services.
 St Thomas' House Library: Situated at St Thomas' Campus, its holdings cover all aspects of basic medical sciences, clinical medicine and health services research, and particularly focus on dermatology and paediatrics.
 Institute of Psychiatry Library: The library is the largest psychiatric library in Western Europe, holding 3,000 print journal titles, 550 of which are current subscriptions, as well as access to over 3,500 electronic journals, 42,000 books, and training materials. The collections focus on psychiatry, psychology, neuroscience, neurology, genetics and psychotherapy.
 Weston Education Centre Library: Situated at the Denmark Hill Campus, the library has particular strengths in the areas of gastroenterology, liver disease, diabetes, obstetrics, gynaecology, paediatrics and the history of medicine. The collection supports the teaching and research of the GKT School of Medicine and the Dental Institute, and also the clinical work of the King's College Hospital and the South London and Maudsley NHS Foundation Trust.

Additionally, King's students and staff have full access to Senate House Library, the central library for the University of London and the School of Advanced Study. Undergraduate and postgraduate students also have reference access to libraries of other University of London institutions under the University of London Libraries Access Agreement.

Museums, galleries and collections 

King's currently operates two museums: Gordon Museum of Pathology and Museum of Life Sciences. Opened in 1905 at Guy's Campus, the Gordon Museum is the largest medical museum in the United Kingdom, and houses a collection of approximately 8000 pathological specimens, artefacts, models and paintings, including Astley Cooper's specimens and Sir Joseph Lister's antiseptic spray. The Museum of Life Sciences was founded in 2009 adjacent to the Gordon Museum, and it houses historic biological and pharmaceutical collections from the constituent colleges of the modern King's College London.

Between 1843 and 1927, the King George III Museum was a museum within King's College London which housed the collections of scientific instruments of George III and eminent nineteenth-century scientists (including Sir Charles Wheatstone and Charles Babbage). Due to space constraints within King's, much of the museum's collections were transferred on loan to the Science Museum in London or kept in King's College London Archives.

The Anatomy Museum was a museum situated on the 6th floor of the King's Building at the Strand Campus. The Anatomy Theatre was built next door to the museum in 1927, where anatomical dissections and demonstrations took place. The Anatomy Museum's collection includes casts of injuries, leather models, skins of various animals from Western Australia donated to the museum in 1846, and casts of heads of John Bishop and Thomas Williams, the murderers in the Italian Boy's murder in 1831. The last dissection in the Anatomy Theatre was performed in 1997. The Anatomy Theatre and Museum was renovated and refurbished in 2009, and is now a facility for teaching, research and performance at King's.

The Foyle Special Collections Library also houses a number of special collections, range in date from the 15th century to present, and in subject from human anatomy to Modern Greek poetry. The Foreign and Commonwealth Office (FCO) Historical Collection is the largest collection contains material from the former FCO Library. The collection was a working tool used by the British government to inform and influence foreign and colonial policy. Transferred to King's in 2007, the FCO Historical Collection contains over 80,000 items including books, pamphlets, manuscript, and photographic material. The Medical Collection include the historical library collections of the constituent medical schools and institutes of King's. The Rare Books Collection holds 12,000 printed books, including a 1483 Venice printing of Silius Italicus’s Punica, first editions of Charles Dickens' novels, and the 1937 (first) edition of George Orwell's The Road to Wigan Pier.

King's College London Archives holds the institution's records, which are among the richest higher education records in London. King's archives collections include institutional archives of King's since 1828, archives of institutions and schools that were created by or have merged with King's, and records relating to the history of medicine. Founded in 1964, the Liddell Hart Centre for Military Archives holds the private papers of over 800 senior British defence personnel who held office since 1900.

Science Gallery London is set to open in 2018 on the Guy's Campus. It is a public science centre where 'art and science collide', and is a part of Global Science Gallery Network. A flagship project for 'Culture at King's College London', Science Gallery will include  of public space and a newly landscaped Georgian courtyard. There will be exhibition galleries, theatres, meeting spaces and a café; while unlike other science centre, it will have no permanent collection. Daniel Glaser, the former Head of Engaging Science at Wellcome Trust, is Director of Science Gallery London.

Rankings and reputation 

Among global university rankings, King's is ranked 31st equal by the 2021 QS World University Rankings, 35th by the 2021 world university rankings of the Times Higher Education, 34th by the 2021 U.S. News & World Report (Best Global Universities Rankings) .

As of 2021, King's is ranked in the top seven UK universities in all the six major academic rankings of global universities: QS, Times Higher Education,  University Ranking by Academic Performance, U.S. News & World Report (Best Global Universities Rankings) and Center for World University Rankings.

According to the 2021 Complete University Guide, 9 out of the 30 subjects offered by King's rank within the top 10 nationally, including Business & Management Studies (2nd), Law (4th), Psychology (5th), Linguistics (6th), Food Science (7th), Sociology (8th), Dentistry (9th), Classics & Ancient History (9th), and Biological Sciences (10th). The Guardian University Guide 2021 ranks King's in the top ten in 6 subjects, including Psychology (2nd), Politics (5th), Law (6th), Anatomy & physiology (8th), Media & film studies (9th), and Philosophy (9th). The Times Higher Education ranks King's College London the top 20 universities in the world for Psychology (11th), and Clinical, pre-clinical & health (16th) in the 2021 World University Rankings by subject. King's College London has had 24 of its subject-areas awarded the highest rating of 5 or 5* for research quality in the 2004 Research Assessment Exercise, and in 2007 it received a good result in its audit by the Quality Assurance Agency.

King's was ranked joint 14th overall in The Sunday Times 10-year (1998–2007) average ranking of British universities based on consistent league table performance. In recent years, however, the university has performed less well in domestic league tables, being placed outside of the top 20 in all three major tables for 2016. The methodologies of these tables include student satisfaction scores with teaching and feedback as a significant input. In common with most other London institutions, King's performs less well on the National Student Survey (NSS), ranking 133rd for student satisfaction (out of 160 institutes) in the 2015 survey.

According to the 2015 Times and Sunday Times University Guide, their inclusion of student satisfaction scores, along with international guides including reputation scores from academics and employers, explains the disparity between King's ranking on their (domestic) table and global tables. They add that when the university is ranked according to student satisfaction scores from undergraduates on factors such as academic support, teaching, assessment and feedback, "King’s ranks 106 out of 123 institutions", although "despite the iffy student satisfaction scores, students continue to apply here in their droves" with an average of 8.1 applicants per place available for 2014 entry. However, although the Complete University Guide has used the results of the NSS since at least 2011, King's retained a position in their top 20 until the 2015 tables (published 2014), managing 19th on the 2014 tables despite ranking joint 102nd (out of 124) for student satisfaction.

In a survey by The New York Times assessing the most valued graduates by business leaders, King's College London graduates ranked 22nd in the world and 5th in the UK. In the 2015 Global Employability University Survey of international recruiters, King's is ranked 43rd in the world and 7th in the UK. King's was chosen as the 5th best UK university by major British employers in 2015.

In 2014, King's ranked 5th amongst multidisciplinary UK universities for highest graduate starting salaries (i.e. graduates' average annual salary six months after graduation). In a big data research by the Institute for Fiscal Studies, University of Cambridge and Harvard University, it was revealed the top 10% of King's male graduates working in England were the 7th highest earning students 10 years after graduation in comparison to graduates of all Higher Education providers (both multi and uni-disciplinary universities) in the UK and the top 10% of its female graduates were the 9th highest earning students 10 years after graduation in the same study. The Guardian University Guide 2017 named King's as the 6th best university in the country for graduate career prospects, with 84.3% of students finding graduate-level jobs within six months of graduation.

In September 2010, the Sunday Times selected King's as the "University of the Year 2010–11". King's was ranked as the 5th best university in the UK for the quality of graduates according to recruiters from the UK's major companies.

Associateship of King's College 
The Associateship of King's College (AKC) is the original award of King's College, dating back to its foundation in 1829 and first awarded in 1835. It was designed to reflect the twin objectives of King's College's 1829 royal charter to maintain the connection between "sound religion and useful learning" and to teach the "doctrines and duties of Christianity".

Today, the AKC is a modern tradition that offers an inclusive, research-led programme of lectures that gives students the opportunities to engage with religious, philosophical and ethical issues alongside their main degree course. Graduates of King's College London may be eligible to be elected as 'Associates' of King's College by the authority of King's College London council, delegated to the academic board. After election, they are entitled to use the post-nominal letters "AKC".

Fellowship of King's College 

The Fellowship of King's College (FKC) is the highest award that can be bestowed upon an individual by King's College London. The award of the fellowship is governed by a statute of King's College London and reflects distinguished service to King's by a member of staff, conspicuous service to King's, or the achievement of distinction by those who were at one time closely associated with King's College London.

The proposal to establish a fellowship of King's was first considered in 1847. John Allen, a former chaplain of King's, was the first FKC. Each fellow had to pay two guineas for the fellowship privilege initially, but the fee was ceased from 1850. A wide variety of people were elected as fellows of King's, including former principal Alfred Barry, former King's student then professor Thorold Rogers, architect William Burges and ornithologist Robert Swinhoe. The first women fellows were elected in 1904. Lilian Faithfull, vice-principal of the King's Ladies’ Department from 1894 to 1906, was one of the first women fellows.

Student life

Students' union 

Founded in 1873, King's College, London Union Society which later, in 1908, reorganised into King's College London Students' Union, better known by its acronym KCLSU, is the oldest students' union in London (University College London Union being founded in 1893) and has a claim to being the oldest Students' Union in England. Athletic Club was one of the nineteenth-century student societies at King's formed in 1884. The union provides a wide range of activities and services, including over 50 sports clubs (which includes the boat club which rows on the River Thames and the rifle club which uses the college's shooting range located at the disused Aldwych tube station beneath the Strand Campus), over 200 activity groups, a wide range of volunteering opportunities, bars/eateries (The Shack, The Shed, The Vault and Guy's Bar), a shop (King's Shop) and a gym (Kinetic Fitness Club). Between 1992 and 2013 the union operated a nightclub, Tutu's, named after alumnus Desmond Tutu.

The former President of KCLSU, Sir Ivison Macadam, after whom the former students' union building on the Strand Campus (Macadam Building) is named, went on to be elected as the first president of the National Union of Students.

"Reggie the Lion" (informally "Reggie") is the official mascot of the students' union. In total there are four Reggies in existence. The original can be found on display in the undercroft of the Union's Bush House base at the Strand Campus. A papier-mâché Reggie lives outside the Great Hall at the Strand Campus. The third Reggie, given as a gift by alumnus Willie Kwan, guards the entrance of Willies Common Room in Somerset House East Wing. A small sterling silver incarnation is displayed during graduation ceremonies, which was presented to King's by former Halliburton Professor of Physiology, Robert John Stewart McDowall, in 1959.

KCLSU owns and operates several student run social spaces, including the cafe/coffee shop The Shed, and the bars Guy's Bar (both on Guy's Campus), The Vault and Philosophy Bar (both on Strand campus).

Student media 
KCLSU Student Media won Student Media of the Year 2014 at the Ents Forum awards and came in the top three student media outlets in the country at the NUS Awards 2014.

Roar News is a tabloid newspaper for students at King's which is owned and funded by KCLSU. It is editorially independent of both the university and the students' union and its award-winning website is read by tens of thousands of people per month in over 100 countries. In 2014 it had a successful awards season, scooping several national awards and commendations, including a Mind Media Award and Student Media of the Year.

The radio station of KCLSU, KCL Radio, was founded in 2009 as a podcast producer. The first live broadcast of KCL Radio was in 2011 at the London Varsity. In 2013, KCL Radio relaunched as a live station with more than 45 hours of live programming a week. The schedule of the radio station includes news, music, entertainment, debate, sport and live performance.

Other King's student media groups include the student television station KingsTV, and the photographic society KCLSU PhotoSoc.

Sports 

There are over 60 sports clubs, many of which compete in the University of London and British Universities & Colleges (BUCS) leagues across the South East. The annual Macadam Cup is a varsity match played between the sports teams of King's College London proper (KCL) and King's College London Medical School (KCLMS). King's students and staff have played an important part in the formation of the London Universities and Colleges Athletics.

Created in January 2013, King's Sport, a partnership between King's College London and KCLSU, manages all the sports activities and facilities of King's. King's Sport runs three fitness centres at the Waterloo, Guy's and Strand Campuses which include various studio spaces. King's Sport also operates three sports grounds in New Malden, Honor Oak Park and Dulwich. There are also on-campus sports facilities at Guy's, St Thomas's and Denmark Hill campuses. King's students and staff can utilize Guy's and St Thomas' NHS Foundation Trust's fitness centre and swimming pool based within the Guy's and St Thomas' hospitals.

Societies and organisations 
In addition to their sporting societies, King's College London also boast 300 other societies and groups in a wide variety of activities. The Societies can be categorised by twelve main groups; Academic, Business & Entrepreneurship, Campaign, Common Interest, Culture, Faith & Spirituality, Fundraising, Media, Medical, Music Performance & Creative, Political and Volunteering.

Student-led think tank 
Following the 2010 student demonstrations against increased tuition fees, King's College London students founded London's first student-led think tank, King's Think Tank (formerly known as KCL Think Tank). With a membership of more than 2000, it is the largest organisation of its kind in Europe. This student initiative organises lectures and discussions in seven different policy areas, and assists students in lobbying politicians, non-governmental organisations (NGOs) and other policymakers with their ideas. Every May, it produces a peer-reviewed journal of policy recommendations called The Spectrum.

Music 
There are many music societies at King's including a cappella groups, orchestras, choir, musical theatre and jazz society. King's has three orchestras: King's College London Symphony Orchestra (KCLSO), King's College London Chamber Orchestra and KCL Concert Orchestra.

Founded in 1945, the Choir of King's College London, one of the most acclaimed university choirs in England, consists of around 30 choral scholars. The choir regularly broadcasts on BBC Radio 3 and Radio 4 and has made recordings mainly focus on 16th-century English and Spanish repertoire.

All the King's Men (AtKM) is an all-male a cappella ensemble from King's College London. Founded in 2009, it has since risen to prominence in the university, becoming the first group outside of Oxford and Cambridge to win The Voice Festival UK.

Pop Superstar, Taylor Swift played at Strand Campus for her first UK gig.

Rivalry with University College London 

Competition within the University of London is most intense between King's and University College London, the two oldest institutions. Indeed, the University of London when it was established has been described as "an umbrella organisation designed to disguise the rivalry between UCL and KCL." In the early twentieth century, King's College London and UCL rivalry was centred on their respective mascots. University College's was Phineas Maclino, a wooden tobacconist's sign of a kilted Jacobite Highlander purloined from outside a shop in Tottenham Court Road during the celebrations of the relief of Ladysmith in 1900. King's later addition was a giant beer bottle representing "bottled youth". In 1923 it was replaced by a new mascot to rival Phineas – Reggie the Lion, who made his debut at a King's–UCL sporting rag in December 1923, protected by a lifeguard of engineering students armed with T-squares. Thereafter, Reggie formed the centrepiece of annual freshers' processions by King's students around Aldwych in which new students were typically flour bombed.

Although riots between respective college students occurred in central London well into the 1950s, rivalry is now limited to the rugby union pitch and skulduggery over mascots, with the annual London Varsity series culminating in the historic match between King's College London RFC and University College London RFC.

Rivalry with the London School of Economics 
On 2 December 2005, tensions between King's and the London School of Economics (LSE) were ignited when at least 200 students from LSE (located in Aldwych near the Strand Campus) diverted off from the annual "barrel run" and caused an estimated £32,000 of damage to the English department at King's. The Times reported that LSE director Howard Davies attended the fun run event, while LSE claimed that Davies only attended for a short time. King's principal, Sir Rick Trainor, deplored the behaviour, appealed to King's students to remain calm and called for no retaliation. The LSE Students' Union later on 6 December issued a formal apology, condemned the actions, as well as promising to foot the bill for the damage repair.

Student residences

Halls of residence 

King's has a total of thirteen halls of residence located throughout London. Accommodation is guaranteed for first year undergraduates and international postgraduates. Great Dover Street Apartments, Wolfson House and Iris Brook and Orchard Lisle are located on Guy's Campus in London Bridge. Brian Creamer House, which was named after Dean of St Thomas's Hospital Medical School Brian Creamer, and the Rectory are situated in the grounds of Lambeth Palace near St Thomas' Campus. Stamford Street Apartments is located opposite Waterloo Campus and within walking distance of Strand Campus, and Champion Hill Residence is close to Denmark Hill Campus in south London. Urbanest Tower Bridge is located within a walking distance from the Tower of London and Tower Bridge. There are two new accommodations for 2018 such as Atlas and Vauxhall. Angel Lane in Stratford, Ewen Henderson Court, Julian Markham House in Elephant and Castle, Moonraker Point in Southwark and Stratford One are nominated residences run by the Unite Group. Hampstead Residence was a residence near the former King's Hampstead Campus, but was sold by King's College London and is no longer a King's venue.

Intercollegiate halls of residence 
In addition to halls of residence run by King's, full-time students are eligible to stay at one of the Intercollegiate Halls of Residence offered by the University of London. King's has the largest number of bedspaces in the University of London Intercollegiate Halls. There are a total of eight intercollegiate halls of the University of London. Canterbury Hall, College Hall, Commonwealth Hall, Connaught Hall, Hughes Parry Hall and International Hall are located near Russell Square in Bloomsbury. Lillian Penson Hall is situated in Paddington, and Nutford House is situated in Marble Arch. Additionally, students can apply to live in International Students House.

Notable people

Notable alumni 

Notable alumni in the sciences include Nobel laureates Peter Higgs (Physics), Sir Michael Houghton (Medicine), Michael Levitt (Chemistry), Max Theiler (Medicine) and Sir Frederick Hopkins (Medicine); polymath Sir Francis Galton; Chief Investigator on the Oxford–AstraZeneca COVID-19 vaccine Sir Andrew Pollard; Raymond Gosling who took Photograph 51 which was critical evidence in identifying the structure of DNA; co-discoverer of Hepatitis C and of the Hepatitis D genome Qui-Lim Choo; pioneer of in-vitro fertilisation (IVF) Patrick Steptoe; mammal cloning pioneer Keith Campbell;  pathologist Thomas Hodgkin; founder of modern hospice philosophy Dame Cicely Saunders; botanist David Bellamy; Shaw Prize laureate Sir Richard Doll; Kyoto Prize laureate Anthony Pawson; Wolf Prize laureates Michael Fisher (Physics) and Sir James Gowans (Medicine); Lasker Award winner John Hughes; Gairdner Foundation International Award winner R. John Ellis; beriberi researcher Takaki Kanehiro; inventor of kerosene Abraham Pineo Gesner; inventor of the seismometer John Milne, and at least 111 Fellows of the Royal Society.

Notable King's alumni in poetry and literature include the poet John Keats (Guy's Hospital), the dramatist Sir W. S. Gilbert, and the writers Thomas Hardy, Sir Arthur C. Clarke, Virginia Woolf, Alain de Botton, Sir Michael Morpurgo, W. Somerset Maugham, Charles Kingsley, C. S. Forester, John Ruskin, Radclyffe Hall, Dame Susan Hill, Hanif Kureishi, Maureen Duffy, Khushwant Singh, Sir Leslie Stephen and the Booker Prize winner Anita Brookner.

King's alumni in religion include the Nobel Peace Prize laureate and Archbishop Emeritus of Cape Town, Desmond Tutu, former Archbishop of Canterbury, Lord Carey, former Chief Rabbi of the United Kingdom and the Commonwealth, Lord Sacks, Primate of All Ireland, Richard Clarke, Archbishops of Cape Town, Njongonkulu Ndungane and Joost de Blank, Archbishop of the West Indies John Holder, Archbishop of New Zealand Churchill Julius, Bishop of Cape Coast, Victor Atta-Baffoe, and the Ethiopian cardinal Berhaneyesus Demerew Souraphiel.

Notable King's alumni to have held senior positions in British politics include two Speakers of the House of Commons (Lord Maybray-King and Lord Ullswater), one Foreign Secretary (David Owen), and the former Cabinet ministers Lord Watkinson, Lord Passfield and Lord Wilmot. As of the current Parliament there are 18 King's graduates in the House of Commons and 17 King's graduates in the House of Lords including Lord Carlile, Lord Clinton-Davis, Lord Dunlop, Lord Kakkar, Lord MacGregor, Baroness Morgan, Baroness O'Loan, Lord Owen, Lord Plant, Lord Rowlands, Baroness Watkins, and the Lords Spiritual Tim Dakin, Nick Holtam, and Tim Thornton.

King's alumni in the arts include the impressionist Rory Bremner; Queen bassist John Deacon; Chief Executive of the Royal Opera House Alex Beard; Oscar winners Greer Garson, Edmund Gwenn and Anne Dudley; Grammy Award winners Boris Karloff, Sir John Eliot Gardiner and Peter Asher; Emmy Award winning director Sacha Gervasi, and the Golden Globe-winning composer Michael Nyman.

In law, King's alumni include the Chief Prosecutor of the International Criminal Court Karim Ahmad Khan, Judge of the International Court of Justice, Patrick Lipton Robinson; current High Court judges Sir David Foskett, Dame Bobbie Cheema-Grubb, Sir David Foxton and Dame Heather Williams, and current Lady Justice of Appeal Geraldine Andrews.

King's alumni in the military include former Deputy Supreme Allied Commanders Europe Sir Adrian Bradshaw and Sir Tim Radford, Chief of the Defence Staff Sir Tony Radakin, Chief of the Imperial General Staff Lord Harding, Chief of the Air Staff Sir Michael Wigston, head of the Singapore Armed Forces Neo Kian Hong, head of the Nigerian Armed Forces Ola Ibrahim, head of the Maltese Armed Forces Martin Xuereb, head of the Bruneian Armed Forces Hamzah Sahat, and two recipients of the Victoria Cross, Ferdinand Le Quesne and Mark Sever Bell.

King's is also the alma mater of the founder of Bentley Motors, Walter Bentley; oil magnate and philanthropist Calouste Gulbenkian; journalists Antoine Allen, Martin Bashir, Francine Lacqua, Diana Magnay, Sophie Long, Jane Corbin, Tom Rogan, Sean Fletcher, Anita Anand and David Bond; and the Olympic gold medalists Dame Katherine Grainger, Paul Bennett, and Kieran West.

Nobel laureates 

There are 14 Nobel laureates who were either students or academics at King's College London. The latest laureates are Sir Michael Houghton who received the 2020 Nobel Prize in Physiology or Medicine and Sir Roger Penrose who received the 2020 Nobel Prize in Physics.

Notable academics and staff 

King's has benefited from the services of academics and staff at the top of their fields, including Sir Charles Lyell (lawyer and geologist), Sir Charles Wheatstone (best known for the Wheatstone bridge), Robert Bentley Todd (best known for describing Todd's paresis), James Clerk Maxwell (mathematical physicist), Florence Nightingale (the founder of modern nursing), Joseph Lister (pioneer of antiseptic surgery), Charles Barkla (best known for the study of X-rays), Sir Charles Sherrington (known for his work on the functions of neurons), Sir Edward Appleton (physicist), Sir Owen Richardson (physicist), Maurice Wilkins (best known for contributions to the discovery of the structure of DNA), Rosalind Franklin (best known for contributions to the discovery of the structure of DNA), Mario Vargas Llosa (writer), Sir Roger Penrose (mathematical physicist) and John Ellis (theoretical physicist).

Heads of state, government and international organizations 

King's has educated numerous foreign Heads of State and Government including two former Presidents of Cyprus, Tassos Papadopoulos and Glafcos Clerides, Prime Minister of Jordan Marouf al-Bakhit, President of the Seychelles France-Albert René, Prime Minister of the Bahamas Sir Lynden Pindling, President of Uganda Godfrey Binaisa, Prime Minister of Iraq Abd al-Rahman al-Bazzaz, Prime Minister of Grenada Maurice Bishop, Prime Minister of Saint Kitts and Nevis Sir Lee Moore, Governor General of Ghana William Hare, 5th Earl of Listowel, Governor General of Saint Vincent and the Grenadines Sir Sydney Gun-Munro, Governor of The British Virgin Islands Augustus Jaspert, Governors of the Turks and Caicos Islands Martin Bourke and John Freeman, Governor of the Falkland Islands Nigel Phillips, and Acting Prime Minister of Moldova Natalia Gherman.

At ministerial level King's alumni include Deputy Prime Ministers of Canada (Anne McLellan), Singapore (S. Rajaratnam), Turkey (Recep Akdağ) and Egypt (Ziad Bahaa-Eldin); Vice Presidents of Kenya (Michael Kijana Wamalwa) and Sierra Leone (Francis Minah and Abdulai Conteh); Foreign Ministers of Bulgaria (Nickolay Mladenov), Japan (Hayashi Tadasu), Malaysia (Rais Yatim), Pakistan (Sir Muhammad Zafarullah Khan, later President of the UN General Assembly and the International Court of Justice), Ghana (Obed Asamoah), Kenya (James Nyamweya), Sierra Leone (J. B. Dauda) and Guyana (Sir Shridath Ramphal, later Secretary-General of the Commonwealth, and Frederick Wills); and Chairman of the Irish Provisional Government Michael Collins.

In popular culture

Film and television settings 
The neoclassical facade of King's, with the passage which connects the Strand to the Somerset House terrace has been utilised to reproduce the late Victorian Strand in the opening scenes of Oliver Parker's 2002 film The Importance of Being Earnest. The East Wing of King's appears, as a part of Somerset House, in a number of other productions, such as Wilde, Flyboys, and The Duchess.

The Maughan Library has also been the location of some film shoots of popular movies and TV series, most notably Johnny English (see Maughan Library description), The Imitation Game, Enola Holmes and V for Vendetta. Corridors from Guy's Campus were also used in the making of BBC series Killing Eve.

Part of Dan Brown's novel The Da Vinci Code was set in the Round Reading Room of the Maughan Library, although no part of the film adaption was filmed there.

In September 1979, The Greenwood Theatre at Guy's Medical School (now King's GKT Medical School) became the first home for the BBC's Question Time programme.  In December 2018, Question Time returned to the Greenwood Theatre for David Dimbleby's last programme as host.

See also
 Armorial of UK universities
 List of universities in the UK

Notes

References 

 Bibliography

 
 
 
 
 
 
 
 
 
 
 
 Comment – quarterly newsletter of King's College London, edited by the Public Relations Department.
 Profile – annual publication of King's College London.
 Report – annual publication of King's College London.

Further reading 
 
 Huelin, G. (1978) King's College London, 1828–1978.
 Jones, C. K. (2004) King's College London: In the service of society.
 
  (Includes King's students who matriculated in or graduated from the University of London)
  (Includes personnel from King's)

External links 
 

 
University of London
1829 establishments in England
Educational institutions established in 1829
Former theological colleges in England
Russell Group
Universities UK